Geocarto International is an academic journal published by Taylor & Francis.
It focuses on remote sensing, GIS, geoscience and environmental sciences. Its editor-in-chief is Kamlesh Lulla. The 2019-2020 Journal Impact IF of Geocarto International is 4.889, which is updated in 2020.

References

Taylor & Francis academic journals
Remote sensing journals
Earth and atmospheric sciences journals
Geographic information systems